The Spencer Foundation was established in 1962 by Lyle M. Spencer. This foundation makes grants to support research in areas of education that are widely construed. It is currently led by its president, Na'ilah Suad Nasir.

Founder 
Lyle M. Spencer was the founder of The Spencer Foundation. Spencer grew up in Appleton, Wisconsin, and attended college in the Pacific Northwest. He received both an undergraduate degree and a master's degree in sociology from the University of Washington in Seattle. Lyle Spencer's father served as president at said university from 1927 to 1933.  Spencer continued graduate work in sociology at the University of Chicago. He also served as the co-founder of a different association, Science Research Associates, also known as SRA. Spencer also participated on the trustees' board of three universities, he was a director of what is now the United Negro College Fund, and actively sat on the committees for education at Harvard University and the University of Chicago. During his graduate studies in 1938 at the University of Chicago he first founded Science Research Associates (SRA), an educational publishing firm. From SRA he obtained the wealth that enabled the creation of the Spencer Foundation.

The SRA nearly went bankrupt in the first year and Spencer gave up this idea, essentially creating a commercial firm in 1939. IBM purchased the SRA in 1964; meanwhile, Spencer maintained the position of the firm's chief executive officer up until 1968. Spencer came to realize the potential for his large fortune could affect educational research around the world after IBM bought it. Spencer left passion-filled notes on a vision for the Spencer Foundation. He expressed his concern for individual people and the individual learning process and his desire to support and fund educational projects. His essential wish was to improve educational opportunities. While serving as CEO at SRA, Spencer has also participated on the trustees' board of three universities, he was a director of what is now the UNCF, and actively sat on the committees for education at Harvard University and the University of Chicago. Lyle M. Spencer died of pancreatic cancer on August 21, 1968, and was buried in Appleton, Wisconsin.

History 
Upon Spencer's death in 1968, the foundation received a large endowment. The foundation began making formal grants in 1971. The foundation has since made grants totaling $250 million.

Intentions and purposes 
With Lyle Spencer's directions, the Foundation works to investigate ways in which education can be improved around the world. There is a great dedication to research, as it is necessary for the improvement of education. The Spencer Foundation supports research programs in high-quality investigation of education. By awarding research grants, and fellowships, the Foundation remains running. The foundation strengthens the connections in education research, policy and practice through communications and networking.

National Academy of Education/Spencer Foundation Dissertation Fellowship Program 
The foundation awards a series of prestigious fellowships to doctoral students completing dissertation research in any area of education research. Each fellowship is for $25,000 and supports individuals in the final year of their doctoral training. The average number of fellowships awarded is 25 out of 600 applicants. Selection is determined by members of the National Academy of Education and by highly respected senior education research scholars. It provides a number of networking and professional development opportunities and informally is seen as an indicator of who are some of the most promising researchers in education.

National Academy of Education/Spencer Foundation Postdoctoral Fellowship Program 
The foundation also awards a series of prestigious fellowships to early career education researchers, typically pre-tenured professors at research intensive institutions. Each fellowship is for a total of $55,000 and is for one or two years depending on the preference of the recipient. The fellowship relieves the researcher from a year's worth of teaching responsibilities in order to pursue an innovative and important education research project. The average number of fellowships awarded is 20 out of 200 applicants each year. Selection is determined by a committee of members of the National Academy of Education. Only scholars who have graduated from their doctorates within the previous five years may apply. Recipients of the fellowship also are recognized as the most promising young scholars in education research, and this is widely considered to be one of the top distinctions available to an early career researcher.

External links
The Spencer Foundation website

Educational foundations in the United States
Organizations established in 1962